César Bernardo Dutra (born 27 January 1992), simply known as César, is a Brazilian professional footballer who last played as a goalkeeper for Boavista.

Career

Flamengo
César debuted for Flamengo on 7 December 2013 in the last match of the 2013 Brazilian Série A against Cruzeiro at Maracanã Stadium, the match ended 1-1.

On 18 May 2018 César extended his contract with Flamengo until April 2022.

Ponte Preta (loan)
In February 2016 César moved to Ponte Preta on loan hoping to gain more experience, although he didn't play a single match during the 2016 season.

Ferroviária (loan)
On 29 December 2016 César moved again on loan, this time to Ferroviária to play in the 2017 São Paulo State League. Shortly after he returned to Flamengo.

Career statistics

Honours

Club
Flamengo
Copa Libertadores: 2019
Recopa Sudamericana: 2020
Campeonato Brasileiro Série A: 2019, 2020
Supercopa do Brasil: 2020, 2021
Copa do Brasil: 2013
Campeonato Carioca: 2014, 2019, 2020, 2021

International
Brazil U-20
FIFA U-20 World Cup: 2011

References

External links

1992 births
Living people
Footballers from Rio de Janeiro (city)
Brazilian footballers
Association football goalkeepers
Campeonato Brasileiro Série A players
Campeonato Brasileiro Série B players
CR Flamengo footballers
Associação Atlética Ponte Preta players
Associação Ferroviária de Esportes players
Esporte Clube Bahia players
Brazil under-20 international footballers
Brazilian expatriate footballers
Expatriate footballers in Portugal
Boavista F.C. players